Jalan Sultan Haji Ahmad Shah, formerly Jalan Khidmat Usaha, is a major road in Kuala Lumpur, Malaysia. It was named after seventh Yang di-Pertuan Agong, Sultan Ahmad Shah of Pahang (1979–1984).

On 26 November 2014, the Kuala Lumpur City Hall (DBKL) changed the name of Jalan Khidmat Usaha to Jalan Sultan Haji Ahmad Shah.

A proposed direct link road from the NKVE and DUKE Highway interchange connecting the Persiaran Dutamas junction has been planned for and under the KL Metropolis development.

List of junctions

References

Roads in Kuala Lumpur